Lieutenant-Colonel Sir Richard Hamilton Glyn, 9th Baronet OBE, TD, DL (12 October 1907 – 24 October 1980) was a British army officer, Conservative politician and authority on breeding pedigree dogs. He was the son of Sir Richard Glyn, 8th Baronet, and his wife Edith Hamilton-Gordon, the great-granddaughter of the Prime Minister Lord Aberdeen.

Glyn was educated at Worcester College, Oxford, where he read law. He was called to the Bar in 1935. Two years later he published what became a standard reference work, "Bull Terriers and How to Breed Them", which he had started to research while at Oxford. His interest in livestock derived from his work on the family estates in Dorset, which he farmed from the 1940s.

During World War II he served with the Queen's Own Dorset Yeomanry and in 1943 wrote a history of the regiment. He was its Commander in 1944–45 and again from 1953 to 1956; on retiring from the full-time army he was an active member of the Territorial Army, being Deputy Commander of No. 128 Infantry Brigade, winning the Territorial Decoration, and becoming ADCTA to the Queen.

At the North Dorset by-election of 1957, Glyn was elected as a Conservative Member of Parliament. While still a new MP he was chosen to second the 'Loyal Address' after the Queen's Speech, and he was appointed as Parliamentary Private Secretary to Sir David Eccles. In 1960 he succeeded as ninth Baronet of Ewell and fifth Baronet of Gaunt's House. He was a Commonwealth War Graves Commissioner.

Glyn's interest in livestock had continued and he was made Chairman of Crufts, a position he held for ten years. After stepping down from Parliament at the 1970 general election, he devoted more time to his hobby and was Chairman of the Kennel Club in 1973.

References
 Obituary, "The Times", 29 October 1980.

External links 
 

1907 births
1980 deaths
Baronets in the Baronetage of Great Britain
Dog breeders
Conservative Party (UK) MPs for English constituencies
UK MPs 1955–1959
UK MPs 1959–1964
UK MPs 1964–1966
UK MPs 1966–1970
Alumni of Worcester College, Oxford
British Army personnel of World War II
Queen's Own Dorset Yeomanry officers
Richard